The Shaoshan 7 (Chinese: 韶山7) is a type of electric locomotive used on the People's Republic of China's national railway system. They are widely used on electrified lines in the southwest part of China.

Design
The design of SS7 was influenced by the 6K, an electric locomotive model imported from Japan.

The first SS7 was built in 1992 in Datong. In 1997, SS7s were used in Nanning-Kunming Railway. However, SS7's frequent failure lead to Datong Electric Locomotive Works making improvements to SS7s. Failure was reduced to just four cases in one year in 2004.

SS7 Electric Locomotive was still produced as of 2007. Most of SS7s belong to Liuzhou Locomotive Depot, Nanning Railway Bureau. The last two SS7s (8112 and 8113) belong to Xiaoyi-Liulin Railway, which is located in Shanxi.

Derivatives
Derivatives of SS7 include SS7B, SS7C, SS7D and SS7E.

SS7B 

In 1997, Datong Electric Locomotive Works developed the SS7B Electric Locomotive. There were only two SS7Bs manufactured, both SS7Bs' each axis axle load 25 tons.

At first, two SS7Bs belonged to Kunming Locomotive Depot, Kunming Railway Bureau. Later the two SS7Bs were transferred to Nanning Locomotive Depot, Nanning Railway Bureau. In 2005, SS7B-0001 was destroyed in an accident which happened on the Nanning-Kunming Railway.

SS7C 
In 1998, Datong Electric Locomotive Works and Zhuzhou Electric Locomotive Research Institute, Chengdu Locomotive and Rolling Stock Works developed SS7C Electric Locomotive. There were 171 SS7Cs manufactured.

SS7Cs' each axis axle load 22 tons, and support head-end power.

SS7D 
In 1999, Datong Electric Locomotive Works and Zhuzhou Electric Locomotive Research Institute, Chengdu Locomotive and Rolling Stock Works developed SS7D Electric Locomotive. There were 59 SS7Ds manufactured, and belong to Xi'an Locomotive Depot, Xi'an Railway Bureau.

SS7D use lightweight design, each axis axle load 21 tons, and support head-end power. Its maximum speed is 170 km/h.

SS7E 
In 2001, Datong Electric Locomotive Works and Dalian Electric Traction R & D Center, Dalian Locomotive & Rolling Stock Works developed the SS7E Electric Locomotive. There were 146 SS7Es manufactured.

SS7E use lightweight design, however its axle arrangement is Co'Co '. Each axis axle load 21 tons, and support head-end power. Its maximum speed is 170 km/h.

Named locomotive 
 SS7-0076, "May 4th's Red Flag" (Chinese: 五四红旗号).
 SS7D-0631,"Steelers Iron Horse"(Chinese: 钢人铁马号).

Gallery

Manufacturers 
SS7s have been manufactured by several companies:
 Datong Electric Locomotive Works (Most of SS7s.)
 Dalian Locomotive & Rolling Stock Works (SS7E Electric Locomotive's 7000 Series.)

References

Bo-Bo-Bo locomotives
SS7
25 kV AC locomotives
CNR Datong Electric Locomotive Co. locomotives
Railway locomotives introduced in 1992
Standard gauge locomotives of China